Pradhan Mantri Garib Kalyan Anna Yojana (PMGKAY) is a food security welfare scheme announced by the Government of India on March 26 2020, during the COVID-19 pandemic in India. The program is operated by the Department of Food and Public Distribution under the Ministry of Consumer Affairs, Food and Public Distribution. But the nodal ministry is Ministry of Finance.

The scheme aims to feed the poorest citizens of India by providing grain through the Public Distribution System, to all the priority households (ration card holders and those identified by the Antyodaya Anna Yojana scheme). PMGKAY provides 5 kg of rice or wheat (according to regional dietary preferences) per person and 1 kg of dal to each family holding a ration card. The scale of this welfare scheme makes it the largest food security program in the world.

Statisticshttps://pib.gov.in/PressReleasePage.aspx?PRID=1780091

Under the National Food Security Act, 2013, 35 kg of food grains were provided to families, Whom holding Antyodaya ration cards and 5 kg food grains per person to families holding Priority distribution cards at subsidized rates.

During the Covid-19 pandemic, Prime Minister Narendra Modi announced that an additional 5 kg of food grains would be provided for free of cost to each person in the household those holding an Antyodaya and Priority ration card. where Anthyodaya and Priority ration card holders had  been receiving subsidized food grains under the Prime Minister's Food Security Scheme for the Poor along with the regular distribution of food grains. Under PMGKAY, 1121 metric tonnes of food grains were distributed in seven phases from April 2020 to December 2022 at a cost of Rs 3.9 lakh crore.

From 1 January 2023, the Prime Minister's Garib Kalyan yojana, Food Security Scheme for the Poor has not been extended. It eliminates and simplifies the price difference among the states, those under the "One Nation One Ration" scheme. It is budget around 2lakh crore for central government.

Overview
The scheme was initially launched on 26 March 2020 with an announcement by the Prime Minister of India, Narendra Modi, who announced the program as part of the existing Pradhan Mantri Garib Kalyan Yojana welfare initiative in his first address to the nation during the COVID-19 pandemic.

The scheme was further extended to November 2020 in a later address to the nation by Modi. By the end of May 2020, the food ministry estimated that the program had reached 740 million beneficiaries. Praising the program, a government official noted the coverage under the welfare scheme as "impressive". Another union minister commented on the scheme, saying: "This will ensure no one sleeps hungry in the country..."

As the initiative was due to expire by the end of June 2020, ten states in the country requested an extension of the time frame. This was confirmed by Modi in his sixth address to the nation since the onset of COVID-19 in India. With consideration to the upcoming festival season in India, Modi announced the extension of PMGKAY up to November 2020, which according to government estimates would benefit 800 million beneficiaries. The scale of the scheme makes it the biggest food security program in the world. Reporting on Modi's speech, the Financial Express claimed the scheme "could feed 2.5 times the US population, 12 times the UK population, and twice the European Union's population". Modi thanked the "hardworking farmers and honest taxpayers" in his speech for the success of the scheme. Immediately after Modi's announcement, the Home Minister of India, Amit Shah, called a meeting of the Group of Ministers to ensure the smooth implementation of the scheme.

In response to the states' request for an extension of the food security program, Minister for Food Supplies Ram Vilas Paswan further commented that another flagship scheme of the government, "One Nation - One Ration Card", is being planned and scheduled to be launched in March 2021. The new proposed scheme is devised to cater especially to migrant laborers to help them receive subsidized grain from any "fair price" shops across the country.

Failure of distribution due to corruption at ground level
Data released after PM Modi's speech from the Ministry of Consumer Affairs, Food and Public Distribution revealed that most of the free grain failed to be distributed to intended recipients due to corruption among food dealers and village council members. Both Goa and Telangana distributed no grain at all with a further 11 (Andhra Pradesh, Gujarat, Jharkhand, Ladakh, Maharashtra, Meghalaya, Odisha, Sikkim, Tamil Nadu, and Tripura) distributing less than 1% of their allocated amount in April and May 2020. A further six (Bihar, Gujarat, Maharashtra, Tamil Nadu, Sikkim, and Ladakh) also distributed zero grain in June 2020.

Ram Vilas Paswan, the Union Minister of Consumer Affairs, Food and Public Distribution said that "Some states are not distributing grain to the poor. [We] have problem in providing foodgrain to states, so when it is being given free, I don't understand the problem in distribution. We are taking this issue seriously". The Food Secretary Sudhanshu Pandey blamed a lack of migrant workers for the failure to distribute grains. The director of Oxfam India, Ranu Bhogal, blamed corruption among food dealers and village council members.

Success
As per a study conducted by International Monetary Fund, published on 5 April 2020, found that extreme poverty (less than PPP USD 1.9 per person per day) in India is less than 1 per cent in 2019 and it remained at that level even during the COVID-19 pandemic year 2020. Prime Minister Narendra Modi's food security scheme, the Pradhan Mantri Garib Kalyan Anna Yojana, has been critical in preventing any increase in extreme poverty levels in India during the COVID-19 pandemic. The new IMF paper, Pandemic, Poverty, and Inequality: Evidence from India, presented estimates of poverty (extreme poverty PPP USD 1.9 and PPP USD3.2) and consumption inequality in India for each of the years 2004-5 through the pandemic year 2020-21. These estimates include, for the first time, the effect of food subsidies on poverty and inequality. Extreme poverty was as low as 0.8 per cent in the pre-pandemic year 2019, and food transfers were instrumental in ensuring that it remained at that low level in the pandemic year 2020. Post-food subsidy inequality at .294 is now very close to its lowest level of 0.284 observed in 1993/94. A low level of extreme poverty in two consecutive years, and one including the pandemic, can be considered as an elimination of extreme poverty. The PMGKAY was critical in preventing any increase in extreme poverty levels in India and the doubling of food entitlements worked substantially in terms of absorbing the COVID-19 induced income shocks on the poor, said the IMF report. Meanwhile, PM Modi had announced the extension of PMGKAY last month till September 2022. Under the PMGKAY, free food grain is provided to those in need. The scheme was kickstarted in March 2020 amid the COVID-19 pandemic in the country and it was extended till March 2022 in November last year for four months (December 2021-March 2022). The scheme entails providing 5 kg foodgrains per person per month, over and above the regular monthly NFSA foodgrains. The benefit is being provided to those covered under the National Food Security Act (NFSA) [Antodaya Anna Yojana and Priority Households] including those covered under Direct Benefit Transfer (DBT). The government had in March 2020 announced the distribution of additional free-of-cost foodgrains (rice/wheat) to about 80 crore National Food Security Act (NFSA) beneficiaries in the wake of the situation created by COVID-19 so that the vulnerable households do not suffer on account of non-availability of adequate foodgrains. The pandemic shock is largely a temporary income shock, said the IMF report, adding that a temporary fiscal policy intervention was the fiscally appropriate way to absorb a large part of the shock. Consumption growth (an important determinant of poverty) was found to be higher in 2014-19 than the robust growth observed in 2004-2011. The paper also examined, in some detail, the plausibility of the results contained in the NSS consumer expenditure survey of 2017-18.</ref>

References

External links
 Pradhan Mantri Garib Kalyan Anna Yojana

Modi administration initiatives
Ministry of Social Justice and Empowerment
2016 in Indian economy
COVID-19 pandemic in India
Economic responses to the COVID-19 pandemic
Government schemes in India